The Belgian State Railways Type 12 was a class of  steam locomotives for express passenger service, introduced in 1888. They were the successors of the Belgian State Railways Type 1 locomotives.

Construction history
The locomotives were built by various manufacturers from 1888 to 1897.
The machines had an outside frame with the cylinders and the Walschaert valve gear located inside the frame.

References

Bibliography

External links
 ETH-Bibliothek Zürich, Bildarchiv. S.A. Cockerill Seraing, Chemins de Fer de l‘Etat belge No 196, viewer
 ETH-Bibliothek Zürich, Bildarchiv. S.A. Cockerill Seraing, Chemins de Fer de l‘Etat belge No 1939, viewer
 ETH-Bibliothek Zürich, Bildarchiv. S.A. Cockerill Seraing, Chemins de Fer de l‘Etat belge No 1297, viewer
 ETH-Bibliothek Zürich, Bildarchiv. S.A. Cockerill Seraing, Chemins de Fer de l‘Etat belge, viewer

2-4-2 locomotives
Steam locomotives of Belgium
Standard gauge locomotives of Belgium